Niki Aneja Walia is an Indian television and film actress who works in Hindi films and television serials. She is the cousin of actor Parmeet Sethi.

Personal life
She married Sonny Walia in February 2002 and moved to the UK the same year. The couple has twins (a boy, Sean and a girl, Sabrina). She currently resides in England.

Career
Niki has worked as a model, compere, VJ, host and actress on television and film (Bollywood). She has acted for nearly 30 years in over 31 television serials across genres.

She is best known for her role as Dr. Simran Mathur in the Hindi TV series Astitva...Ek Prem Kahani on Zee TV. She played the role of Nikki in Zee TV serial "Baat ban jaye"

She was also a judge for Femina Miss India 1994 which resulted in the win for Miss World for Aishwarya Rai Bachchan and Miss Universe for Sushmita Sen.

Niki was a runner-up at Miss World University in 1991, resulting in her being World Ambassador for Peace 1991–1992. She worked in Cloud 9 which was UK's first British Asian soap.

Filmography

Films

Web series

Television

References

External links 

 
 

Indian television actresses
Living people
1972 births
Ahluwalia